CJRF-FM (93.1 MHz) is a Canadian FM radio station in the Estrie region of Quebec, owned by La Fabrique de la Paroisse de Sainte-Praxède-de-Bromptonville. The station airs a francophone Catholic religious radio format, and is officially licensed to the Sherbrooke arrondissement of Brompton.

The station was licensed by the CRTC on November 6, 1995, originally at broadcasting 89.5 MHz. In 2004, the station changed its frequency to its current 93.1 MHz frequency.

References

External links
 

Radio stations in Sherbrooke
Christian radio stations in Canada
Catholic radio stations
French-language radio stations in Quebec
Year of establishment missing